Ben Killip (born 24 November 1995) is an English professional footballer who plays as a goalkeeper for  club Hartlepool United.

Career
Whilst playing for Norwich City, Killip spent two loan spells at Lowestoft Town. He signed for Grimsby Town in July 2017. He was released by Grimsby at the end of the 2017–18 season.

Killip signed for Braintree Town on 31 July 2018.

He moved to Hartlepool United in May 2019. In the 2019–20 season, Killip struggled for form after making several mistakes and lost the number one spot to Mitchell Beeney, however he soon regained his place in the team. The next season, Killip had a much more successful campaign managing to keep 13 clean sheets in 29 matches. On April 5 2021, in a 2–2 draw with Boreham Wood, Killip injured his elbow and was ruled out for the rest of the 2020–21 season. Killip did, however, make the substitutes bench for the play-offs as the club won promotion to League Two in June 2021.

He signed a new contract for Hartlepool at the end of the 2020–21 season. In August 2021, Killip kept a clean sheet in Hartlepool's first game back in the Football League as Hartlepool beat Crawley Town 1–0. Killip's performance in the EFL Trophy semi-final against Rotherham United earned him player of the round. Hartlepool eventually lost 5–4 on penalties with Killip saving one penalty in the shootout. On 11 May 2022, Killip's contract option was exercised, keeping him at the club until the end of the 2022–23 season. Killip received some criticism for his form during the middle of the 2022–23 season, most notably after an error in a 1–0 defeat to Stevenage when he was getting ready to kick the ball downfield without noticing that Danny Rose was behind him, allowing Rose to steal the ball and score into an empty net in the 80th minute.

International career

In September 2018, Killip received his first call up for the England C team for their game against Estonia u23s.

Career statistics

Honours
Hartlepool United
National League play-offs: 2021

References

1995 births
Living people
Footballers from Isleworth
English footballers
England semi-pro international footballers
Association football goalkeepers
Chelsea F.C. players
Norwich City F.C. players
King's Lynn Town F.C. players
Lowestoft Town F.C. players
Grimsby Town F.C. players
Braintree Town F.C. players
Hartlepool United F.C. players
Northern Premier League players
National League (English football) players
English Football League players